Yanomamia is a genus of lizards in the family Gymnophthalmidae. The genus is endemic to Guyana.

Species
The genus Yanomamia contains two accepted species.
Yanomamia guianensis 
Yanomamia hoogmoedi 

Nota bene: A binomial authority in parentheses indicates that the species was originally described in a genus other than Yanomamia.

References

 
Lizards
Taxa named by Kátia Cristina Machado Pellegrino
Taxa named by Tuliana Oliveira Brunes
Taxa named by Sergio M. Souza
Taxa named by Marcia Maria Laguna
Taxa named by Teresa C.S. Ávila-Pires
Taxa named by Marinus Steven Hoogmoed
Taxa named by Miguel Trefaut Rodrigues